Robert Middleby (born 9 August 1975) is an Australian former football player who as a right-back or right midfielder. He was the CEO of the Newcastle Jets FC until 2015. He played for Sydney FC after earlier stints at Newcastle United Jets, Wollongong Wolves (twice), Carlton, Football Kingz and the Newcastle Breakers. He won the 2001 NSL title with the Wolves and the 2006 A-League title with Sydney FC and also spent time overseas with German outfit KFC Uerdingen 05.

Career

Sydney FC
Middleby was born in Newcastle, New South Wales, Australia. He saw little game time under coach Pierre Littbarski in his first season at the club, playing only 212 minutes in 16 appearances despite scoring in Sydney FC's 3–1 victory against New Zealand Knights early in the campaign. He gained favour, though, under Littbarski's replacement Terry Butcher and was a regular starter in the 2006–07 season. Despite missing part of the season with a broken collarbone after a controversial off-the-ball incident involving Melbourne Victory FC defender Adrian Leijer, Middleby was voted Sydney FC Players' Player of the Year for the season.

Middleby accidentally broke David Beckham's rib, when Sydney FC played the Los Angeles Galaxy at ANZ Stadium in November 2007. Middleby also scored in this match.

North Queensland Fury
In November 2008, Middleby signed a contract with North Queensland Fury. He has been used in his more preferred role of right back, as well as being used in central midfield under coach Ian Ferguson. On 11 February 2010, he announced his retirement from professional football at the end of the 2009–10 season Middleby played his last game against Gold Coast United FC, which North Queensland won 2–1.

Newcastle Jets
Middleby resigned as CEO for the Newcastle Jets FC in the A-League in January 2015. Upon retiring, Middleby said "I will use the next few weeks to support the mid-season review process".

Career statistics

Honours
Sydney FC
 A-League Championship: 2005–06
 Oceania Club Championship: 2004–05

Wollongong Wolves
 NSL Championship: 2000–2001
 Oceania Club Championship: 2000–01

Individual:
 Sydney FC Player of the Year: 2006–07

References

External links
 North Queensland Fury profile
 Oz Football profile

1975 births
Living people
Sportspeople from Newcastle, New South Wales
Australian soccer players
Association football defenders
Association football midfielders
Australian expatriate sportspeople in England
Australia international soccer players
Australia youth international soccer players
Australia under-20 international soccer players
2002 OFC Nations Cup players
A-League Men players
2. Bundesliga players
National Soccer League (Australia) players
Australian Institute of Sport soccer players
Newcastle Breakers FC players
Wollongong Wolves FC players
KFC Uerdingen 05 players
Football Kingz F.C. players
Carlton S.C. players
Newcastle Jets FC players
Sydney FC players
Northern Fury FC players
Australian expatriate soccer players
Australian expatriate sportspeople in Germany
Expatriate footballers in Germany
Australian expatriate sportspeople in New Zealand
Expatriate association footballers in New Zealand
Soccer players from New South Wales